Dexbrompheniramine is an antihistamine with anticholinergic properties used to treat allergic conditions such as hay fever or urticaria. It is the pharmacologically active dextrorotatory isomer of brompheniramine. It was formerly marketed in combination with pseudoephedrine under the name Drixoral in the US and Canada. It is an alkylamine antihistamine.

Dexbrompheniramine is a first generation antihistamine that reduces the effects of the neurotransmitter histamine in the body; sneezing, itching, watery eyes, and runny nose.

Interactions  
MAO inhibitors within 14 days. MAO inhibitors include isocarboxazid, linezolid, phenelzine, rasagiline, selegiline, and tranylcypromine.

Potassium

Drinking alcohol can increase side effects of dexbrompheniramine.

References

External links

Amines
Enantiopure drugs
H1 receptor antagonists
Bromoarenes
2-Pyridyl compounds